Demetrida piceola is a species of ground beetle in Lebiinae subfamily. It was described by Csiki in 1932 and is an endemic species of New Caledonia.

References

Beetles described in 1932
Insects of New Caledonia
piceola